Thipatcha Putthawong (Thai:ทิภัชชา พุทธวงค์, born 7 March 2004) is a Thai cricketer. In January 2020, at the age of 15, she was selected in Thailand's squad for the 2020 ICC Women's T20 World Cup. Along with Suwanan Khiaoto, she was one of two cricketers selected for Thailand's squad at the Women's T20 World Cup who were not in the squad for the qualification tournament in Scotland. Prior to being named in Thailand's squad for the Women's T20 World Cup, she made her Women's Twenty20 International (WT20I) debut for Thailand, against Myanmar, on 12 January 2019 in the Thailand Women's T20 Smash.

In November 2021, she was named in Thailand's team for the 2021 Women's Cricket World Cup Qualifier tournament in Zimbabwe. She played in Thailand's first match of the tournament, on 21 November 2021 against Zimbabwe.

In October 2022, she played for Thailand in Women's Twenty20 Asia Cup.

References

2004 births
Living people
Thipatcha Putthawong
Thipatcha Putthawong
Thipatcha Putthawong
Thipatcha Putthawong
Thipatcha Putthawong